Sound Event is a 2002 studio album by American turntablist Rob Swift. It was released on Tableturns.

Critical reception

Tom Semioli of AllMusic gave the album 3.5 out of 5 stars, calling it "an explosive and intelligent collection of wicked scratching, in-the-pocket beats, startling imagery, and whiz-kid wordplay." Sam Chennault of Pitchfork gave the album an 8.3 out of 10, saying, "The genius of this album is not only Rob Swift's skill, but also the restraint he shows in displaying his considerable talent."

Laura Checkoway of Vibe said, "Instead of overwhelming listeners with robotic DJ overload, Sound Event artfully combines technical dexterity with simple rap lyrics, live instrumentals, and politically charged sound bites."

Track listing

References

External links
 

2002 albums
Rob Swift albums
Albums produced by Large Professor